Xiaoxinzhuang Township is a township-level division of Xinji, Shijiazhuang, Hebei, China.

References

Township-level divisions of Hebei